Jay Rabinowitz may refer to:
 Jay Rabinowitz (film editor), American film editor
 Jay Rabinowitz (jurist) (1927–2001), American jurist and Chief Justice of the Alaska Supreme Court